Waldemar Pawlak  (born 5 September 1959) is a Polish politician. He has twice served as Prime Minister of Poland, briefly in 1992 and again from 1993 to 1995. From November 2007 to November 2012 he served as Deputy Prime Minister and the Minister of Economy. Pawlak is the only person who held the office of prime minister twice during the Third Republic (i.e., since 1989), and he remains Poland's youngest prime minister to date.

He is also a long-time commander of the Polish Volunteer fire department, holding the rank of Brigadier General. Since 2015 Pawlak is workstream leader for the AMU (Agency for the Modernisation of Ukraine), where he contributes his expertise in economy.

Early life, education and early political career
Pawlak was born in the village of Model, Masovian Voivodeship on 5 September 1959. He is a graduate of the Warsaw University of Technology. While he was a student and during martial law in 1981 he actively participated in strikes.

After graduation (1984) he became a computer teacher in Kamionka (near Pacyna). His political career began in 1985, when he joined the United People's Party. After 1990, like many UPP members, he joined the UPP's successor, the Polish People's Party. He was elected from UPP office to the Contract Sejm (1989) and has remained a member of Sejm since then. He became leader (Prezes) of the UPP in 1991.

Premiership of Waldemar Pawlak

First Premiership

                                                            

On 5 June 1992, 00:00 AM, after a vote of no confidence was approved, with 273 in favour and 119 against, Jan Olszewski was forced to resign as Prime Minister and his cabinet was immediately replaced in an event known as the nightshift ("Nocna zmiana"). After Olszewski's dismissal, President Lech Wałęsa designated the little-known and inexperienced Pawlak as caretaker Prime Minister with the mission, to form a new coalition government with agrarians, Christian democrats and liberals. Pawlak's potential partners, the Democratic Union and the Confederation of Independent Poland were not ready to agree on a compromise programme. The fact was that Pawlak and nobody else was called upon to form a new government that was nevertheless a remarkable phenomenon. According to Aleksander Kwaśniewski, it was a 'historical step' towards a 'normalization' of Polish political and party life. 

After 33 days as a caretaker, Pawlak failed to gain support from the Sejm majority and failed in a vote of confidence. Pawlak was forced to resign as Prime Minister and the President replaced him with Hanna Suchocka, who won support from the majority and successfully formed a coalition with the Democratic Union, Christian National Union, Liberal Democratic Congress, Peasants' Agreement, People's Christian Party, Party of Christian Democrats and Polish Beer-Lovers' Party. Pawlak's failure paved the way for another political coalition.

Since Pawlak's first cabinet did not receive support from the Sejm, at this time, Pawlak had no official ministers, only temporary chiefs of executive branches. His first cabinet was the briefest government during this period that lasted only 33 days, this was a notable period commonly known as Pawlak's 33 days (33 dni Pawlaka). Although Pawlak failed to form a government, he gained considerable respect from his 33 days in office. Pawlak was a counterweight to politicians who focused on the issue of lustration, and the backstage of these events was later described by Kult in the song "Mr. Waldek, Don't Be Afraid, or the Lefty June" ("Panie Waldku, Pan się nie boi, czyli Lewy czerwcowy"), which referred to the fall of Jan Olszewski's cabinet.

Second Premiership

The Polish People's Party and the social democratic, post-communist Democratic Left Alliance (SLD) won the 1993 election in a landslide, holding a super-majority and the support of the socialist-agrarian government, with Pawlak as Prime Minister again.

Józef Oleksy of the SLD became Sejm Marshal, while SLD leader Aleksander Kwaśniewski remained a Sejm Member without portfolio.

Prime Minister Pawlak and Kwaśniewski soon found themselves at bitter political odds. Kwaśniewski reportedly had an ambition to become "Prime Minister de facto", while Pawlak wanted to retain the power of his office. Both leaders used their parties to fight for power.

Pawlak was initially in an informal alliance with President Wałęsa against the SLD. However, their good political relations soon dissipated.

In 1995, Pawlak offered three options to Kwaśniewski. First, he would remain Prime Minister but with Kwaśniewski as Deputy and Minister of Foreign Affairs. Second,  the Democratic Left Alliance would form a government with Kwaśniewski as Prime Minister. Third, Oleksy would become Prime Minister under the present coalition. Pawlak reportedly thought that Kwaśniewski would not risk a minority Democratic Left Alliance government without the support of the majority of the elevation of his main partisan opponent, Oleksy, to Prime Minister and therefore rather be the deputy of Pawlak. However, Kwaśniewski surprised many by choosing the third option.

Pawlak was known for his reticence and aversion to journalists. The opposition and the media accused him of a lack of dynamism and a terrible information policy. Pawlak gave up the prime ministerial Volvo 780 limousine in favour of a FSO Polonez Caro, equipped with a Rover V8 engine to show solidarity with the automotive industry in Poland. This gesture was well-received by Poles at a time when the country was suffering poverty.

In the political wilderness

Despite good public approval ratings Pawlak failed in his bid for the Presidency in 1995, finishing a distant fifth (after Kwaśniewski, Wałęsa, Jacek Kuroń and Jan Olszewski) and winning only 770,417 votes (4.31%).

After losing the political battle with Kwaśniewski and, after that, the presidential election, there was a movement to replace Pawlak with Jarosław Kalinowski as party leader in 1997.

PSL suffered a great political disaster during the 1997 parliamentary elections and became the smallest party in the Sejm (from 132 seats in 1993 to just 27).

After the SLD won decisively in the 2001 parliamentary election Kalinowski became deputy of the new Prime Minister Leszek Miller when the PSL joined the coalition. Pawlak did not play a major role during this period.

Comeback

Pawlak's comeback began in 2005 when he became PSL leader again.

In the liberal Civic Platform (PO)-PSL government, formed after the 2007 parliamentary election, Pawlak became Deputy Prime Minister and Minister of Economy under Prime Minister Donald Tusk.

Although PSL remained the smallest party represented in the Sejm, Pawlak is often cited as having achieved a major political victory.  During his time in the party chair his party enjoyed better electoral results, the elimination of major competition among agrarian voters from the also agrarian dominated party (Samoobrona), and the resumption of major influence in rural areas. Additionally, PSL was put in charge of three cabinet posts in the Tusk government. (Without the PSL votes, the PO would not have a Sejm majority, even though it easily accounts for the biggest political group in the sitting parliament.)

On 21 April 2010, PSL announced that Pawlak would be the party's official candidate for the 2010 presidential election. He received only 1.75% of the vote and didn't get into the second round.

Personal life
Pawlak is married and has children.

Second Waldemar Pawlak cabinet
Members of Pawlak's cabinet:
 Prime Minister: Waldemar Pawlak (PSL)
 Deputy PM and Minister of Finance: Marek Borowski (SLD)
 Deputy PM and Minister of Justice: Włodzimierz Cimoszewicz (SLD)
 Deputy PM and Minister of Education: Aleksander Łuczak (PSL)
 Minister of Construction: Barbara Blida (SLD)
 Minister of Culture: Kazimierz Dejmek (PSL)
 Minister of Property Conversion: Wiesław Kaczmarek (SLD)
 Minister of Defense: Piotr Kołodziejczyk
 Minister of Transport: Bogusław Liberadzki (SLD)
 Minister of Interior: Andrzej Milczanowski
 Minister of Labor: Leszek Miller (SLD)
 Minister of Foreign Affairs: Andrzej Olechowski
 Director of the CUP (Central Planning Office): Mirosław Pietrewicz (PSL)
 Minister of Economic Cooperation with Foreign Business: Lesław Podkański (PSL)
 Minister of Industry and Trade: Marek Pol (UP)
 Director of the URM (the Cabinet Office): Michał Strąk (PSL)
 Minister of Agriculture: Andrzej Śmietanko (PSL)
 Minister of Communications: Andrzej Zieliński (PSL)
 Minister of Environment Preservation: Andrzej Żelichowski (SLD)
 Minister of Health: Ryszard Żochowski (SLD)
 President of the Committee for Scientific Research: Witold Karczewski

References

|-

|-

|-

|-

1959 births
Living people
People from Gostynin County
Polish People's Party politicians
20th-century Polish farmers
21st-century Polish educators
Prime Ministers of Poland
Deputy Prime Ministers of Poland
Candidates in the 1995 Polish presidential election
Candidates in the 2010 Polish presidential election
Members of the Polish Sejm 1991–1993
Members of the Polish Sejm 1993–1997
Members of the Polish Sejm 1997–2001
Members of the Polish Sejm 2001–2005
Members of the Polish Sejm 2005–2007
Economy ministers of Poland
Members of the Polish Sejm 2007–2011
Members of the Polish Sejm 2011–2015
21st-century  farmers